Eupithecia marnoti is a moth in the family Geometridae. It is found in Uzbekistan.

References

Moths described in 1988
marnoti
Moths of Asia